Darreh Asiab-e Rashid (also Romanized as Darreh-Asīāb-e Rashīd) is a village in Ozgoleh Rural District, Ozgoleh District, Salas-e Babajani County, Kermanshah Province, Iran. At the 2006 census, its population was 156, in 28 families.

References 

Populated places in Salas-e Babajani County